The 2018 edition of the annual Royal Yachting Association Youth National Championships is set to be held at Largs Sailing Club in Largs, Scotland, with racing taking place between 2 April and 6 April. The contestants will compete for the RYA Youth National title in their class, with the winners representing Great Britain at the Youth Sailing World Championships 2018 in Corpus Christi, Texas in the US in July.

Equipment

Men's events

Women's events

Open events

Youth sailing
National youth sports competitions
2018 in sailing
April 2018 sports events in the United Kingdom
Largs